Receiver is a first-person shooter video game developed by Wolfire Games. The game attempts to portray realistic gun mechanics through a unique reloading system, where each step of reloading is assigned a different button. The player scavenges items and audio tapes which reveal the story in a procedurally generated world.

Receiver was released in June 2012 for Linux, Microsoft Windows, and Mac OS X. In 2013, the game was made available as a free copy for people who had previously purchased another Wolfire Games video game, Overgrowth.

The game's sequel, Receiver 2, was announced on December 13, 2019 through a video uploaded to YouTube by Wolfire Games. It was released for Windows, Linux, and Mac OS X on April 14, 2020.

Gameplay 
In Receiver, players must control an in-game character, known as a "Receiver", to search for eleven audio tapes from around a procedurally generated world, randomly arranged after each death. Ammunition and flashlights are scattered throughout the world as well. Players start with a random handgun, either a Smith & Wesson Model 10 revolver, a Colt M1911A1 semi-automatic pistol, or a selective fire Glock 17 pistol with an automatic sear. Players are also given a random inventory of ammunition and/or spare magazines for their weapon. Players may also start with a flashlight. While searching for tapes, the player encounters stationary sentry turrets and mobile hover drones that attack the player. A single hit to the player will kill them. Shooting these automated defenses can disable them, with shots to vital components, such as cameras, weapons, a motor, or a battery scoring significantly more damage. If a player dies, they lose all progress and the game is reset with a new randomly-generated level layout, spawn position, and inventory.

A core element of the game is how the player fires and reloads the handgun. The gun has to be used in a semi-realistic fashion, meaning that all aspects of reloading the gun have to be enacted individually with different key presses. Rather than finding magazines as seen in most shooters, the player finds cartridges which must be individually loaded into the revolver chambers or pistol magazines. In-game actions mapped to individual key presses include, but are not limited to: removing the magazine from the pistol, inserting a cartridge into a magazine, inserting a magazine into the pistol, pulling back the slide, cocking the hammer, toggling the safety, inspecting the chamber, releasing the slide stop, and spinning the cylinder of the revolver. To emphasize understanding of the firearm, the player's handgun starts in a random condition; the magazine or chamber may be loaded or empty, the slide may be locked or unlocked, and the safety may be on or off.

Plot 
The audio tapes describe a technology called "mindtech", how an antagonistic entity called "the Threat" has applied it within media to weaken the human population, and that it now has unleashed a catastrophic event called "the mindkill". Further, they detail various planes of existence, explain firearm operation, and instructs the player to listen to a "cleartape" in order to become "awake". One tape contains only background hum and static.

Receiver 2 
In Receiver 2, all gun mechanics are simulated, instead of some, according to developer Wolfire Games. The player locates and plays 4~6 audio tapes in a procedurally generated world. Bullets and flashlights are also scattered throughout the world as well. Players start with a random handgun. All guns from previous games, including the Smith & Wesson Model 10 revolver, the Colt M1911, and the select-fire Glock 17 all make a return. New guns are also added, including the Colt Detective Special, the Desert Eagle Mark I, the Beretta M9, the SIG Sauer P226, the Hi-Point C-9, and the Colt Single Action Army. Some specific tapes now include darker tones and topics, which will grow worse and worse throughout the tape, until it sounds like the Receiver recording is likely attempting to commit suicide. This is a "Threat echo", in which "the voice of the Threat" takes control of the player's firearm and hands, in an attempt to force them to commit suicide too. This can be prevented by unloading the gun before the player completely loses control and the barrel is turned to the in-game character's face.

Development 
Receiver was originally created as part of the 7 Day FPS Challenge in 2012, built on "gun handling mechanics, randomized levels, and unordered storytelling."

The game was released in June 2012, and on Steam in April 2013 after being accepted as part of Steam Greenlight.

The first content update for Receiver was released on September 3, 2012, and added a flashlight, a Smith & Wesson Model 10 revolver, and a Glock 17, among other features.

The source code of the game is available since 2012 on GitHub under non-commercial license conditions.

The game was last updated on 9/14/2019, which added an entire graphics overhaul as well as improving the game's back drop.

Reception 
In Destructoid's 8.5/10 review, they said that "successfully reloading a gun for the first time through sheer muscle memory is easily one of the greatest feelings in gaming", concluding that "Receiver is one of those games that feels so incredibly satisfying once it is finally understood".

The Verge described the game as "wrapped up in a slick package that really makes you feel like a cool, infiltrating spy."

See also 
Black Shades, a previous first-person shooter made by Wolfire founder David Rosen

References

External links 
 

Survival video games
Tactical shooter video games
Windows games
Steam Greenlight games
Linux games
MacOS games
First-person shooters
2012 video games
Simulation video games
Video games developed in the United States
Video games using procedural generation
Commercial video games with freely available source code
Game jam video games
Single-player video games
Video games with Steam Workshop support